Photinus harveyi is a species of firefly native to Jamaica. It was first described by the American biologist John B. Buck in 1947 and was named in honour of the American zoologist E. Newton Harvey, a leading authority on bioluminescence.

References

Lampyridae
Bioluminescent insects
Beetles described in 1947